Start Packing is the debut album by Run On, released in 1996 through Matador Records.

Critical reception
Trouser Press wrote that "the first half is winsomely melodic, while a more abrasively experimental (but still accessible) sonic approach dominates the latter portion." Washington City Paper wrote that the album "bounces from combustible drone ’n’ squall ('Miscalculation') to dusty Velvet melancholy ('Doesn't Anybody Love the Dark') to sexy rhythmic grooves ('Go There')." The Stranger deemed it "some of the most complex and beautiful work of the era." The Chicago Reader called the album "superb," writing that "Sue Garner's sweet, languid, but most of all powerful vocals spin golden threads of melody while Alan Licht's nervy guitar rumbles beneath with purposeful noise and texture."

Track listing

Personnel 
Run On
Rick Brown – drums, synthesizer, clarinet, vocals, percussion, programming
Sue Garner – bass guitar, guitar, piano, organ, tambourine, vocals, cover art
Alan Licht – guitar, bass guitar, piano, accordion, vocals
David Newgarden – organ, synthesizer, trumpet, tuba, marimba, percussion
Production and additional personnel
Tony Cenicola – photography
Rod Hui – mixing, recording
John McEntire – recording
Anne McNeil – photography
Jerry Teel – recording
Wharton Tiers – mixing

References

External links 
 

1996 debut albums
Matador Records albums
Run On (band) albums